Kevin Baron (born 1975) is an American journalist, and the founding executive editor of Defense One, a subdivision of Atlantic Media.

Education 
Baron graduated from the University of Richmond in 1997, with a B.A. in international studies, and from the George Washington University with an M.A. in media and public affairs in 2004.

Career 
Previously, he was national security staff writer for National Journal and a reporter for Stars and Stripes, the Boston Globe Washington bureau, and the Center for Public Integrity.

Awards

 2010 Military Reporters & Editors Award
 2009 George Polk Award, Military Reporting
 2003 George Polk Award, Internet Reporting, (Center for Public Integrity)
 2008 ICIJ Daniel Pearl Award for Outstanding International Investigative Reporting, Finalist
 2008 Scripps-Howard Foundation National Journalism Award, Washington Reporting, Finalist
 2007 Associated Press Managing Editors (APME) Award, International Perspective, Finalist
 2006 Monthly Journalism Award, Washington Monthly, December 2006

Works
"Files prove Pentagon is profiling reporters", Stars and Stripes, Charlie Reed, Kevin Baron, Leo Shane III, August 27, 2009

References

External links

Author page at Defense One
Journalist's blog

American male journalists
1975 births
George Polk Award recipients
University of Richmond alumni
George Washington University School of Media and Public Affairs alumni
Living people